Donny Warmerdam (born 2 January 2002) is a Dutch footballer who currently plays as a midfielder for Jong Ajax.

Career statistics

Club

Notes

References

External links
 Career stats & Profile - Voetbal International

2002 births
Living people
Dutch footballers
Netherlands youth international footballers
Association football midfielders
AFC Ajax players
Jong Ajax players
Eerste Divisie players